The Type Directors Club (TDC) is an international organization devoted to typography and type design, founded in 1946 in New York City. TDC believes that type drives culture, and that culture drives type—and is dedicated to cataloging, showcasing, and exhibiting typography worldwide.

 Founding member Milton Zudek described the club's goals at their first exhibit opening in 1947:

Timeline

1943: The club was started as an unofficial gathering in 1943. Founding member Milton Zudeck described the club’s goals: “We simply want to make more and more advertising people aware of the important of the agency typographer. We want them to realize that the selection of type for an advertisement demands a sixth sense that goes beyond the basic knowledge of typefaces.” 

1946: The Type Directors Club organization was formed by several leading NY art directors, including Aaron Burns, Louis Dorfsman and Milton Zudeck. 

1960: The TDC was composed of men for many years until 1960 when they recruited its first woman member, designer Beatrice Warde. Today, the Beatrice Warde Scholarship stands to commemorate Beatrice Warde and all her contributions to the field of typography and to the TDC.  

1967: The TDC medal is the organization's most prestigious award dedicated to the artful craft of type and typography. As of 2022 there have been 34 medalists. in 1967 the first TDC medal was awarded to Hermann Zapf. 

1987: The TDC’s first international conference Type 1987 was held in Manhattan, giving participants the opportunity to gather with “stars” from outside the US like Adrian Frutiger and Neville Brody. 

2018: As part of a rebranding led by Debbie Millman, the TDC adopted the Type Drives Culture conference slogan. The same year, the club held the first Ascenders competition, aimed to promote the hottest designers under 35; and created a BIPOC scholarship, which was later renamed the Ade Hogue Scholarship.  

2022: The TDC closed after a financial insolvent collided with the resignation of board member Juan Villanueva, who, in an open letter, called it a “racist organization”. Later that same year it merged with The Once Club for Creativity.  

2022: Upon the TDC’s reopening, Ksenya Samarskaya was appointed as TDC Managing Director with a mission to make it more open, diverse, and culturally engaging. TDC hosted Ezhishin, the first conference about Native North American typography.

Conferences
In 1955 the first TDC competition was held to recognize outstanding work in the profession. The TDC’s first international conference, Type 1987 was held in Manhattan, giving participants the opportunity to gather with “stars” from outside the US like Adrian Frutiger and Neville Brody. in 2018, as part of a rebranding led by Debbie Millman, the TDC adopted the “Type Drives Culture” conference slogan which remains at the heart of the TDCs annual conference. 

The most recent Type Drives Culture 22 conference held various sessions with the overarching theme “Type: The Next 75 Years”.

TDC Medal 
The TDC Medal is awarded for significant contributions to typography.

Competitions
Since the 1950s the TDC has been holding yearly type competitions: one for the use of type and the letterform in design and the other, typeface design. The winners are reproduced in the Typography Annual, as well as displayed in seven exhibits that travel worldwide. In addition to celebrating outstanding achievements, the typography competitions and resulting annuals serve as important historical records of typographic trends, and are an invaluable resource for both designers and scholars.[3]

Typography
Previously known as Communication Design, the Typography competition is the extension of the original competition started in the 1950s.

Type Design
The Type Directors Club Type Design Awards are given annually for excellence in typeface design. The award is generally viewed as being the most prestigious in the field.

Type Design Winners by Year

Lettering
Started in 2022.

Ascenders
In 2018, the TDC inaugurated Ascenders, a competition to recognize the achievements of designers 35 years of age and younger. In its inaugural year, TDC honored nineteen Ascenders from around the world.

TDC Annual — World’s Best Typography 

TDC produces a design annual that features award-winning typography. The 2017 publication, The World's Best Type and Typography, was designed by Leftloft of Milan.

Scholarships 
Beatrice Warde Scholarship

Winners receive a $5,000 USD award as well as a free one-year student membership to the TDC, offering discounts and other opportunities for conferences and events.

Previous winners of the award include Doha Kwon (2022) Ximena Amaya (2021), Tatiana Lopez (2020), Blossom Liu (2019), Anna Skoczeń (2018), Tasnima Tanzim (2017), Ania Wieluńska (2016), and Rebecca Bartola (2015).

Ade Hogue Scholarship

Formerly known as the Superscript scholarship.
Previous winners of the award include Ana Robles (2022) and Sakinah Bell (2021)

Ezhishin Scholarship

Started in 2023, the annual $5,000 scholarship, funded by Google, is for Native American and First Nation individuals in the US and Canada, respectively, who exemplify a creative practice that explores typography, type design, or relevant linguistic work. Winners receive a $5,000 USD award as well as a free one-year student membership to the TDC, offering discounts and other opportunities for conferences and events.

Sponsors
The TDC is sponsored by A to A Studio Solutions, Adobe Typeset, Typeset Design Matters, Designer Journals, Facebook Analog Research Laboratory, Firebelly, Google, Glyphs, Monotype, Morisawa, Pandora, School of Visual Arts,  SVA Masters in Banding, Type Network which help to support the following initiatives:

 TDC Typography Annual
 Student scholarships
 Salons in NYC and other US cities
 Educational workshops
 TDC Book Night
 TDC Competition Judges Night
 New York exhibitions at TDC
 International exhibitions of competition winners
 Special events

References

External links
 
 TDC Annuals

Typography
Design awards